Methuen is a 23-square-mile (60 km2) city in Essex County, Massachusetts, United States. The population was 53,059 at the 2020 census. Methuen lies along the northwestern edge of Essex County, just east of Middlesex County and just south of Rockingham County, New Hampshire. The city is bordered by Haverhill to the northeast, North Andover to the southeast, Lawrence and Andover to the south, Dracut (Middlesex County) to the west, Pelham, New Hampshire (Hillsborough County) to the northwest, and Salem, New Hampshire (Rockingham County) to the north.

History
Methuen was first settled in 1642 and was officially incorporated in 1726. Methuen was originally part of Haverhill, Massachusetts. In 1724 Stephen Barker and others in the western part of that town petitioned the General Court to grant them permission to form a new town above Hawke's Meadow Brook. Although opposed by their fellow townsmen, the petition was approved the following year (December 8, 1725), and the General Court gave them an act of incorporation under the name of Methuen. The town was named for Sir Paul Methuen, a member of the King's Privy Council and friend of acting Provincial Governor William Dummer.  The first town meeting was held on March 9, 1726, in the home of a resident. The land was set aside for a meetinghouse, which was erected later in 1726 on what is now Meetinghouse Hill Cemetery.

The residents in the northern part of the new town of Methuen soon petitioned to have their own meetinghouse (a combination of town hall and puritan church), and in 1736 the north parish was set off.  Land for a meetinghouse was donated by descendants of the original proprietors of Haverhill, and in 1738 the second Methuen meetinghouse was raised.  The structure survives to this day, as the Salem N.H. Historical Society building. In 1741, with the fixing of the Northern boundary of Massachusetts, most of this new north parish was removed from Methuen and placed in New Hampshire. It was incorporated as Salem, New Hampshire in 1750.

Industrial growth in the 1800s influenced Methuen's development.  Construction of the Methuen Cotton Mills at the Spicket River falls in the 1820s and the increased manufacture of hats and shoes in small factories along the Spicket spurred the centralization of Methuen's economic, residential and cultural activities within the area around Osgood, Broadway, Hampshire and Pleasant streets. Three wealthy and prominent families—the Nevins, the Tenneys and the Searles—played a significant role in Methuen's history and development.  These families were instrumental in the founding of many of Methuen's landmarks, including the Nevins Memorial Library, the Searles building, Tenney Gatehouse, Nevins Home, Spicket Falls, and the Civil War monument between Pleasant and Charles streets.

Geography
Methuen is located at  (42.730040, −71.179352).

Methuen lies alongside the northern banks of the Merrimack River and is bisected by the Spicket (originally "Spigot") River, as well as many brooks and streams. There are several ponds dotting the area as well, and the town is home to a town forest, a bird sanctuary, and a small state park (Tenney State Park). Pine Island, near the southern end of town in the Merrimack River, is also part of the town's land.

Transportation
Methuen lies at the northern end of Interstate 93 in Massachusetts, with three exits providing access. A portion of Interstate 495 crosses through the eastern side of town from Lawrence to Haverhill. Massachusetts Route 213, the "Loop Connector", provides highway access between the two, having three intermediate exits of its own, in addition to the exits for I-93 and I-495. The town is also crossed by Route 28, Route 110, and Route 113, the latter two meeting at I-93 Exit 43 (old exit 46).

Methuen is served by the Merrimack Valley Regional Transit Authority's bus service. Daily intercity bus service to Worcester and New York City is provided by OurBus from the Methuen Park and Ride.  The nearest rail station is in South Lawrence, which is part of the Haverhill/Reading Line of the MBTA Commuter Rail, providing service into Boston's North Station.  Small plane service can be found at Lawrence Municipal Airport and the Merrimack Valley Seaplane Base, with the nearest national service being at Manchester-Boston Regional Airport, and the nearest international service being at Logan International Airport.

Demographics

As of the census of 2000, there were 43,789 people, 16,532 households, and 11,539 families residing in the city. The population density was 1,954.7 persons per square mile (754.8/km). The racial makeup of the city was 89.35% White, 1.35% African American, 0.22% Native American, 2.38% Asian, 0.01% Pacific Islander, 4.87% from other races, and 1.82% from two or more races. Hispanics and Latinos, of any race, were 9.64% of the population (8.4% Dominican, 5.7% Puerto Rican, 0.6% Guatemalan, 0.3% Ecuadorian, 0.3% Mexican, 0.3% Cuban).

There were 16,532 households, of which 33.1% had children under the age of 18 living with them, 53.3% were married couples living together, 12.2% had a female householder with no husband present, and 30.2% were non-families. Of all households, 25.3% were made up of individuals, and 11.6% had someone living alone who was 65 years of age or older. The average household size was 2.62 and the average family size was 3.17.

In the city, the population was spread out, with 24.7% under the age of 18, 7.3% from 18 to 24, 31.0% from 25 to 44, 21.6% from 45 to 64, and 15.3% who were 65 years of age or older. The median age was 38 years. For every 100 females, there were 91.9 males. For every 100 females age 18 and over, there were 87.0 males.

The median income for a household in the city was $49,627, and the median income for a family was $59,831. Males had a median income of $41,693 versus $31,864 for females. The per capita income for the city was $22,305. About 5.8% of families and 7.4% of the population were below the poverty line, including 9.7% of those under age 18 and 7.7% of those aged 65 or over.

Government
Historically, Methuen had a town meeting-selectmen form of government and was known as the Town of Methuen until it adopted a charter replacing its traditional town meeting and selectmen with a council and manager. Even with a form of government that had historically and legally been exclusive to cities, the community, in a gesture of traditionalism, retained the name Town of Methuen in its charter. However, because Massachusetts cities have self-governing powers not available to towns, it became known for legal purposes as "The City Known as the Town of Methuen".  A subsequent charter, which adopted a strong mayor form of government, officially changed the community name to the "City of Methuen".

Methuen's city government consists of a mayor, three Councilors-at-Large, two East District councilors, two Central District councilors, two West District councilors, and six School Committee members. The following are the current members of Methuen's municipal government:

 The mayor of Methuen is Neil Perry. 
 The at-large city councilors are Jessica Finocchiaro, Nicholas Dizoglio, and David DJ Beauregard, Jr.
 The East District city councilors are Steven Saba and Eunice Zeigler.
 The Central District city councilors are James McCarty and Joel Faretra.
 The West District city councilors are Allison Saffie and Mike Simard.

Methuen is part of the Massachusetts Senate's 1st Essex district.

Education

Public schools
 Methuen High School
 Comprehensive Grammar School
 Tenney Grammar School
 Timony Grammar School
 Marsh Grammar School

Private schools
 Saint Monica's is a Catholic for pre-K to 8th grade.
 St. Ann's Home and School provides residential, outpatient, and private day school options for a wide range of learning disabilities and/or behavioral and emotional disorders. All programs are designed to provide a continuum of special needs services to assist children and adolescents who need intensive and comprehensive help for themselves and their families. The Day School program offers education for children and adolescents with special emotional needs, complemented by a strong therapeutic component. Children are transported to St. Ann's from communities in a one-hour radius. Referrals come from school districts seeking an academically focused, clinically supported school setting for students with significant emotional, developmental, behavioral, and learning needs.
 Presentation of Mary Academy was a private Catholic high school founded in 1958. The academy is on a  campus formerly known as the Edward F. Searles Estate. The school was originally for young women in grades 9–12  but went co-educational with the 2011–2012 school year. Due to financial difficulties, the school closed in 2019

Sports

Methuen High School's athletic teams play in the Merrimack Valley Conference.  Their big rivals are the Andover Golden Warriors, the Central Catholic Raiders of Lawrence, and the Haverhill Hillies. On Thanksgiving Day, the football team plays fellow Merrimack Valley foe the Dracut Middies.  The teams first met in a non-Thanksgiving Day game in 1935 and did not play again until the Thanksgiving series started in 1963. The school colors are blue and white, and their mascot is the Ranger, named after Rogers' Rangers, the precursor of the U.S. Army Rangers, which was founded by town resident Robert Rogers.

Historic district

The Searles Tenney Nevins Historic District, established by the city in 1992 to preserve the "distinctive architecture and rich character of one of Massachusetts' most unique neighborhoods", is named after the three Methuen city fathers: David C. Nevins, Edward F. Searles and Charles H. Tenney.

From the City of Methuen:

Today, the trio's collective vision can be seen in mills, housing, schools, mansions, churches, monuments, playgrounds, the library, and the architectural fantasies that resulted from their artistic rivalry. The historic district boundaries were established to include properties and buildings constructed or used by the Searles, Tenney and Nevins families and the people who worked for them.

The historic district is administered by the Methuen Historic District Commission, which protects the district from alterations that might compromise its historic integrity. Property owners within the historic district must obey the Rules and Regulations of the Historic District Commission. The rules and regulations specify general criteria for materials used, size and proportions of the buildings, colors, as well as other features. Any violation of the rules and regulations can result in fines and other possible legal action.

Bounded within the Searles Tenney Nevins Historic District are the Spicket Falls Historic District and the Pleasant-High Historic District. Both are listed on the National Register of Historic Places, as are many of the other buildings within the area.

Points of interest
 Forest Lake is a recreational great pond of over  bordered by the Methuen town forest. Access is managed by the Forest Lake Association. Residents and visitors can engage in a series of activities, including fishing, canoeing, and swimming.
 Methuen Water Works, Cross Street, is listed on the National Register of Historic Places
 Methuen Memorial Music Hall was built specifically to house the Great Organ, built originally by Walcker Orgelbau for the Boston Music Hall, and procured by philanthropist and city benefactor Edward Francis Searles more than a century ago. The organ case, which in approximate terms is as large as a typical house, is ornate and features a bust of J.S. Bach as a central ornament.
 The Methuen Rail Trail occupies the railbanked Boston and Maine Manchester and Lawrence Railroad corridor. It connects the Spicket River Greenway in Lawrence with the in-development Salem Bike-Ped Corridor. Future plans to revitalize this rail line for commuter and freight rail could make this trail a rail-with-trail bike path.
 National Register of Historic Places listings in Methuen, Massachusetts
 The Nevins Memorial Library, founded in 1868 by David Nevins, Sr., was completed in 1883, two years after his death. The grand brick and stained glass library were listed on the National Register of Historic Places in 1984.
 Saint Basil's Seminary is the main US location for the Basilian Salvatorian Order, a community of religious priests of the Greek Catholic rite.
 St Xenia Orthodox Church, a multi-ethnic and multi-cultural parish of Russian Orthodox Church Outside Russia (ROCOR). The church hosts St. John of Damascus Church School.

Notable people
 Steve Bedrosian, Major League Baseball pitcher
 Joseph Bodwell, 40th governor of Maine
 Susie Castillo, Miss Massachusetts USA 2003, Miss USA 2003 and MTV VJ
 Elias James Corey, 1990 Nobel Prize in Chemistry laureate
 Ben Cosgrove, composer and multi-instrumentalist
 Pat DeCola, sports reporter
 Mitchell Garabedian, attorney 
 Andrew Haldane (1917–1944), Marine captain, portrayed in the HBO miniseries The Pacific
 Calvin Kattar, professional MMA fighter competing in the UFC
 Christopher Lennertz, composer for films, television shows, and video games
 Warren Manzi (1955–2016), playwright, Perfect Crime
 Gary McLain former Villanova men's basketball player
 Harriet Nevins, philanthropist, animal rights activist
 Georges Niang, professional NBA player for the Philadelphia 76ers 
 Fred Otash, actor, author, famous private investigator, LA police officer, WWII Marine veteran
 Jimmy Pedro, Olympics bronze medalist
 Edith Prague., Colorado politician
 Mike Rochford, former pitcher for the Boston Red Sox
 Robert Rogers (1731–1795), founder of Rogers' Rangers which led to the creation of the United States Army Rangers
 John Ruiz, professional boxer and former WBA World Heavyweight champion
 Edward Francis Searles (1841–1920), philanthropist, interior and architectural designer
 James Michael Shannon, Massachusetts Attorney General and congressman
 Charles H. Tenney (1842–1919), industrialist and philanthropist

See also
 List of mill towns in Massachusetts

References

External links

 City of Methuen official website
 Nevins Memorial Library
 Methuen History

Notable Court Cases:

 Methuen Public Corruption Allegations – Nesbitt v. City of Methuen, et al.
 

 
1642 establishments in Massachusetts
Cities in Essex County, Massachusetts
Cities in Massachusetts
Massachusetts populated places on the Merrimack River
Populated places established in 1642